Ahmet Hamdi Akseki (1886 – 9 January 1951) was an Islamic scholar who served as the President of the Directorate of Religious Affairs in Turkey. The Ahmet Hamdi Akseki Mosque is named after him.

Biography 
Akseki was born in 1886 in Antalya Province. He both studied and taught at various Madrasas and became an Islamic cleric. Mehmet Rifat Börekçi appointed him as the Vice President of the Directorate of Religious Affairs in 1939, and he remained at the post until the death of Mehmet Şerefettin Yaltkaya, when he took the position of Minister.

References 

1886 births
1951 deaths
Turkish scholars of Islam
People from Antalya Province